Batesville Casket Company manufactures caskets and cremation urns. The company is a subsidiary of Hillenbrand, Inc., and is headquartered in Batesville, Indiana.

The company operates three manufacturing plants in Batesville, Indiana, Chihuahua, Mexico, and Manchester, Tennessee, and a woodworking factory in Vicksburg, Mississippi, that supplies wood to the factory in Chihuahua.

The company traces its roots to 1884, when John A. Hillenbrand began producing handmade wooden caskets. These caskets had ornate carvings made by casket and furniture companies. In 1906, Hillenbrand purchased the failing Batesville Coffin Company, and renamed it to Batesville Casket Company.

References

External links
 Batesville Casket Web Site
 Hillenbrand, Inc. Web Site

Manufacturing companies established in 1884
Manufacturing companies based in Indiana
Coffins
1884 establishments in Indiana